Georgia's 6th congressional district is a congressional district in the U.S. state of Georgia. , it is represented by Republican Rich McCormick. The Georgia 6th district's boundaries were redrawn following the 2020 census to be significantly more Republican-leaning than it had been in the previous decade. The first election using the new district boundaries (listed below) were the 2022 congressional elections. Due to the changing political orientation of the district, McBath announced that she would be running against Carolyn Bourdeaux in the Democratic primary in the neighboring 7th congressional district. McBath subsequently defeated Bourdeaux in the primary. Republican Rich McCormick overwhelmingly beat Democrat Bob Christian for the seat in the 2022 congressional elections, and became the new representative for Georgia's 6th congressional district on January 3, 2023.

Located in north-central Georgia, the district consists of many of the northern suburbs of Atlanta and includes all of Forsyth, Dawson County, portions of eastern Cobb County, northern Fulton County, a snippet of western Gwinnett County, and eastern Cherokee County.

The district is known for producing prominent figures in American politics, including former House Speaker and 2012 presidential candidate Newt Gingrich, former Secretary of Health and Human Services Tom Price, and former U.S. Senator Johnny Isakson. It was also known as a suburban Republican stronghold for much of its recent history. It was in Republican hands from 1992 to 2018. Due to Metro Atlanta's recent population growth, which has brought Democratic-leaning voters into the area, this changed as incumbent Karen Handel, who had won a special election in 2017, lost to Democrat Lucy McBath.

Counties 
 Cobb (Partial, see also  and )
  Forsyth
 Dawson
Gwinnett (Partial, see also)

History
Georgia's 6th congressional district has existed since the 29th Congress (1845–1847), the first Congress in which U.S. representatives were elected from districts rather than at-large. Georgia gained a sixth U.S. representative for the first time in the 13th Congress (1813–1815).

From 1965 to 1993, the 6th District covered a swath of exurban and rural territory south and west of Atlanta. Gingrich was first elected from this district in 1978. In 1992, it moved to its present position in Atlanta's northern suburbs, and Gingrich transferred there; he was reelected three more times from this district, but declined to take his seat after winning reelection in 1998.

List of members representing the district

Election results

1974

2000

2002

2004

2006

2008

2010

2012

2014

2016

2017 special election

2018

2020

2022

See also 
 Georgia's at-large congressional district
 Georgia's 10th congressional district
 Georgia's 4th congressional district
 Georgia's congressional districts
 Georgia's 6th congressional district special election, 2017

References

Further reading

External links 
 PDF map of Georgia's 6th district at nationalatlas.gov
 Georgia's 6th congressional district at GovTrack.us

06